William Atashkadeh (born 12 April 1992 in Gothenburg) is an Iranian-Swedish footballer. He has been capped by the Sweden national under-19 football team.

Club career 
William Atashkadeh was born in Gothenburg and began his career with IFK Göteborg. After a successful 2012 campaign with Örebro SK in the Swedish Allsvenskan, which included scoring 6 goals in 16 appearances, Atashkadeh injured himself and returned to play only 9 games in the 2013 campaign. He joined Örgryte IS in 2015. Atashkadeh was Örgryte's leading goalscorer in the 2015 Division 1 season with 20 goals in 22 league matches.

International career 
Atashkadeh played for the Sweden national under-19 football team. On 19 March 2013, Atashkadeh was invited by Iran manager Carlos Queiroz for their 2015 Asian Cup qualifying camp and trained with them but did not make his first senior international appearance.

Career statistics

References

External links 

1992 births
Living people
Swedish footballers
Swedish people of Iranian descent
Iranian footballers
IFK Göteborg players
Örebro SK players
Örgryte IS players
Allsvenskan players
Superettan players
Footballers from Gothenburg
Sweden youth international footballers
Sportspeople of Iranian descent
Association football forwards